Queen of Siam is the debut album by German thrash metal band Holy Moses, released in 1986 on AAARRG Records. It was re-released in 2005 with the "Walpurgisnight" demo, recorded in 1984–1985, as bonus tracks. All music and lyrics are by Andy Classen and Sabina Classen.

Track listing 
 "Necropolis" – 3:39
 "Don't Mess Around with the Bitch" – 5:35
 "Devil's Dancer" – 4:20
 "Queen of Siam" – 4:24
 "Roadcrew" – 3:12
 "Walpurgisnight" – 3:21
 "Bursting Rest" – 3:39
 "Dear Little Friend" – 5:36
 "Torches of Hire" – 3:06

2005 reissue bonus tracks 
 "Intro"
 "Walpurgisnight"
 "Bursting Rest"
 "Torches for Hire"
 "Queen of Siam"
 "Death Bells"
 "Heavy Metal"

Personnel 
 Sabina Classen – vocals
 Andy Classen – guitar, lead vocals on "Roadcrew"
 Ramon Brüsseler – bass
 Herbert Dreger – drums

Walpurgisnight demo personnel 
 Sabina Classen – vocals
 Andy Classen – guitar
 Ramon Brüsseler – bass
 Jörg Heins – drums

1986 debut albums
Holy Moses albums